Khan M. Asghar Husain (born 23 January 1916) was a member of the 4th and 5th Lok Sabha of India. He represents the Akola constituency of Maharashtra and a member of the Indian National Congress (INC) political party.

He was a Member, Nagpur University Court during  1967-70 and    Governing Body of Shivaji College, Akola.

He was Vice-President of  Municipal Council,    Akola since 1955;

He was President, Berar Muslim Educational Conference since 1969    and Urdu Education Society, Akola.

References

1916 births
20th-century Indian Muslims
Marathi politicians
People from Maharashtra
Lok Sabha members from Maharashtra
India MPs 1971–1977
India MPs 1967–1970
People from Akola district
Date of death unknown
Indian National Congress politicians from Maharashtra